Minnie P. Izett (1862–1924) was a New Zealand artist. Her work is held in the collection of the Sarjeant Gallery in Wanganui.

Biography 
Izett was born in Dunedin. She was an art teacher at Wanganui Technical School in the early 1900s. Izett exhibited at the Auckland Society of Arts, Canterbury Society of Arts, Otago Art Society and the New Zealand Academy of Fine Arts.

References 

1862 births
1924 deaths
20th-century New Zealand artists